The Hyannis Harbor Hawks, formerly the Hyannis Mets, are a collegiate summer baseball team based in Hyannis, Massachusetts. The team is a member of the Cape Cod Baseball League (CCBL) and plays in the league's West Division. The Harbor Hawks play their home games at Judy Walden Scarafile Field at McKeon Park. The team is owned and operated by the non-profit Hyannis Athletic Association. 

Hyannis most recently won the CCBL championship in 1991 when they defeated the Chatham A's two games to none to win the best of three championship series. The title was the third in team history, having won back-to-back league championships in 1978 and 1979. Hyannis joined the CCBL in 1976 as an expansion team, bringing the number of teams in the league at the time to eight.

History

Pre-modern era

Early years

Baseball in the villages of Barnstable dates back to the early days of the sport on Cape Cod. The Barnstable Cummaquids were organized in 1867 and battled the "Yarmouth Mattakeesetts" on at least three occasions that year. After splitting their first two recorded contests, the seemingly evenly-matched teams met for a highly-anticipated third game, this time as an attraction at the Barnstable County Fair. The Cummaquids took the lopsided match, 30–13, and with their victory secured the prize of a "beautiful silver mounted carved black walnut bat costing $15." The Barnstable team met up with a team from Yarmouth again in 1883 for a July 4 contest that had become an annual event. U.S. Congressman Samuel Winslow hurled for Barnstable while a student at Harvard in 1884. An 1885 poster advertising another July 4 contest, this time between Barnstable and Sandwich, was uncovered by the National Baseball Hall of Fame and Museum in Cooperstown, New York. Although no formal league had been established at this time, the poster became the source for the traditional dating of the Cape League's origin to 1885.

From 1888 to 1892, the Hyannis town team was sponsored by "gentlemen of leisure" Charles B. Cory and Charles Richard Crane, who funded and played on the club. At Cory and Crane's expense, various well-known professional and amateur players were brought in to play alongside the Hyannis locals. In 1888, Cory and Crane outfitted the club in "suits which were of the best white flannel and red stockings," and secured the services of pitcher Dick Conway and catcher Mert Hackett, both formerly of the major league Boston Beaneaters. In 1889, Hackett was back, along with Barney Gilligan, who had played for the 1884 major league champion Providence Grays, where he was a teammate of Cape Cod native Ed Conley and batterymate of Baseball Hall of Fame hurler Charles "Old Hoss" Radbourn. Hackett was back again as team captain in 1891, and in the first game of the season, Hyannis hosted a team from Boston that featured Baseball Hall of Famer George Wright at shortstop. After the season, Cory published an extended ode to the Hyannis ballclub in the style of Ernest Thayer's Casey at the Bat.

The Hyannis town team had its share of stars during the early years of the twentieth century. In 1909, former major leaguer Fred Klobedanz pitched for Hyannis. Klobedanz had pitched several seasons with the National League Boston Beaneaters, posting a 26–7 record in 1897 and a 19–10 record in the team's 1898 pennant-winning season. The 1909 Hyannis team also featured Princeton gridiron All-American Sanford White, and Brown University hurler Arthur Staff, who led the team as player-manager through much of the following decade. During this period, the Hyannis team periodically played squads from naval ships docked at or near Cape Cod. In 1909, 1,500 fans saw Hyannis turn a rare triple play in a victory over the team from the USS Missouri, and in 1911 and 1914, Hyannis played several games against the team from the USS Nebraska, billed as the "Base Ball Champions of the Atlantic Fleet." 

Holy Cross star Ed Gill tossed no-hitters for Hyannis in 1916 and 1917, and in the latter did not allow a ball to be hit to the outfield. Gill went on to play in the major leagues for the Washington Senators. Cape Cod native Joel "Joe" Sherman of Yarmouth pitched for Hyannis for many seasons. As a young man, he had played for the team from 1906 to 1913.  Then after a 14-year hiatus he returned to play again for Hyannis from 1927 to 1931. In between, Sherman had a brief stint in the majors with Connie Mack's Philadelphia Athletics in 1915. Sherman's long career with Hyannis, predating even the formation of the league itself in 1923, accounts for his being referred to by some as the "father of the [Cape] league."

The early Cape League era (1923–1939)

In 1923 the Cape Cod Baseball League was formed and originally included Falmouth, Chatham, and two Barnstable teams: Osterville and Hyannis. Hyannis played home games at Hallett's Field on Main Street in downtown Hyannis, and Osterville played at West Bay Field in Osterville. After the 1930 season, the two teams merged into a combined "Barnstable" team, with home games being split between the two ballparks. Funding for town teams during this period was difficult to secure. Teams depended largely on the town itself to appropriate funds, and the impact of the Great Depression made this an especially difficult annual town decision. As a result, the Barnstable team was forced to withdraw from the Cape League for the 1938 season, but was back in 1939, though the league itself folded after that season.

The town's teams had great success in the early Cape League, winning a combined seven league championships during the 17-year duration of the league. The Osterville team won the title in 1924 and 1925. Osterville and Hyannis agreed to share the title in 1926, as weather and the departure of college players for school prevented the scheduling of a decisive game. Hyannis took the title in 1927, and Osterville was back on top in 1928. The combined Barnstable team was league champion in 1934 and 1937. The Barnstable teams of this era were replete with college stars and semi-pro players, many of whom went on to major league careers. 

Hyannis boasted a "parade of sluggers" that included Georgetown University football star Tony Plansky, who went on to play for the NFL's New York Giants. In 1999, Plansky was ranked by Sports Illustrated as the #25 all-time greatest sports figure from Massachusetts. He was inducted into the CCBL Hall of Fame in 2001. Other Hyannis sluggers included NYU's Ken Strong, another collegiate football star who went on to a long NFL career and is a member of the Pro Football Hall of Fame. Brockton, Massachusetts native and Boston College shortstop Freddie Moncewicz played for Hyannis between 1923 and 1927, winning the league title as player-manager in 1926 and 1927, then played for the Boston Red Sox in 1928, and returned to his post as Hyannis player-manager in 1929. Newburyport, Massachusetts native Paddy Creeden joined Hyannis while still a student at Brockton High School in 1924. He played for Hyannis again from 1926 to 1930, and was described as a "very smart ball player, especially fast on his feet and one of the league's leading base stealers." After a brief stint with the Boston Red Sox early in 1931, Creeden returned to play with Barnstable for the remainder of that season. During this era, Hyannis played periodic exhibitions against well-known barnstorming teams such as the House of David, who defeated Hyannis in a 1927 contest, the Lizzie Murphy All-Stars, whom Hyannis defeated in 1930, and the Philadelphia Giants, who played Hyannis in 1926, 1928 and 1929, and featured the celebrated battery of Will "Cannonball" Jackman and Burlin White. In 1929, Hyannisport summer resident and ex-Boston mayor John F. "Honey Fitz" Fitzgerald performed his well-known rendition of Sweet Adeline at a benefit concert for the Hyannis baseball team.

Osterville's 1924 pennant winners featured Shanty Hogan and Danny "Deacon" MacFayden, a Cape Cod native from Truro. The pair had been teammates at Somerville High School, and led Osterville to the 1924 Cape League title. Hogan batted .385 on the season, was named team MVP, and reportedly smashed the "longest home run ever seen" at West Bay Field. He went on to enjoy a 13-year major league career, much of it with the hometown Boston Braves. MacFayden began his major league career in 1926 with the Boston Red Sox, and pitched for a total of 17 years in the major leagues, winning a World Series title with the New York Yankees in 1932. MacFayden was inducted into the CCBL Hall of Fame in 2012. The 1925 CCBL champion Osterville squad featured CCBL Hall of Famer Pat Sorenti, Boston College center fielder Tony Comerford, and second baseman Art Merewether, who had played briefly for the Pittsburgh Pirates. The 1929 Osterville team featured Lynn, Massachusetts native John "Blondy" Ryan, who went on to play for the World Series-winning 1933 New York Giants, Vito Tamulis, who went on to play for the Yankees and Brooklyn Dodgers, and former Dartmouth College football and ice hockey standout Myles Lane. Lane had just completed his rookie season in the National Hockey League, a defenseman for the 1929 Stanley Cup champion Boston Bruins, and played for Osterville through 1931. He went on to a career in law, becoming a New York Supreme Court justice.
 
When the Hyannis and Osterville teams combined in 1931, the new team was led by player-manager Danny Silva, who had filled the same role for Osterville the previous season. Silva had played briefly for the Washington Senators in 1919, and after his playing days became a longtime umpire in the CCBL. In the early 1960s when a knowledgeable and universally respected figure was needed to unify the newly-reorganized Cape League, Silva was chosen and served as the first commissioner of the league's modern era, a position he held from 1962 to 1968. Silva was inducted into the CCBL Hall of Fame as part of its inaugural class of 2000.

From 1933 to 1937, Barnstable was led by player-manager Ed "Pete" Herman, a pitcher from Boston College who had played previously in the league for Chatham. Herman began the 1933 season with an 18-game hitting streak, and later that season proved himself the team's iron man by pitching both halves of a doubleheader. Herman led the club to league championships in 1934 and 1937, and in 1938 it was reported that, "When it comes to picking an All-Cape, All-Time, Cape Cod League manager, 'Pete' will win the nomination hands down."

Herman had brought several players with him from the Chatham team, including infielder Artie Gore and catcher George Colbert. Gore was a crowd favorite, known for his "chatter, pepper, and flashy fielding," he went on to enjoy a ten-year umpiring career in the National League. Colbert, a popular power-hitter, had been Herman's batterymate at Boston College. Described as "loud and humorous", Colbert kept the team loose with entertaining antics such as catching slow pitchers barehanded. 

Herman's clubs also featured several future major leaguers. Boston College pitcher Ed Gallagher twirled for Barnstable in 1931, then played for the Boston Red Sox in 1932, and returned to play for Barnstable again in 1933. Another 1933 Barnstable hurler, Emil "Bud" Roy, went on to play briefly for the Philadelphia Athletics. Quincy, Massachusetts native Ted Olson was a dominant pitcher for Barnstable in 1934 and 1935, and went on to play for the Boston Red Sox. CCBL Hall of Famer Lennie Merullo also played for Barnstable in 1935, and went on to play seven seasons with the Chicago Cubs. 

Barnstable's 1937 league title was won in exciting fashion as ace pitcher Norman Merrill tossed a no-hitter to beat Bourne, 5–0, on the final day of the season to clinch the league title. The win capped a stellar season for Merrill, who won 13 games for Barnstable while batting .394. The powerful team had seven players who batted over .300, and also featured burly slugger John Spirida, who went on to play pro football for the Washington Redskins in 1939. In 1939, the final year of the early Cape League, night baseball was introduced for the first time. Portable lights were staged for Barnstable's game against Falmouth at Falmouth Heights, and the following night the lights were transported to Hyannis for the second game of the home-and-home series between the two clubs.

The Upper and Lower Cape League era (1946–1962)

The Cape League was revived after World War II, and was originally composed of 11 teams across Upper Cape and Lower Cape divisions. Barnstable's entry in the 1946 Lower Cape Division was known as the Barnstable Townies and played at the Barnstable High School field in Hyannis. The team moved to the Upper Cape Division in 1947 where it competed against Barnstable's other newly-formed Cape League team from the village of Cotuit. Osterville, who had merged with Hyannis to form the Barnstable team in 1931, entered its own team in the league in 1948, but only played through the 1950 season.

Early on, the Townies were not a particularly strong team. The team was reportedly not well-managed, and favored veteran players over younger but more talented ones. After much debate regarding sponsorship and naming, the team was rejuvenated under the new moniker Barnstable Barons, and found itself among the top teams in the league in 1951 and 1952, but in June of 1952 impulsively withdrew from the league after a disputed forfeit ruling. The Barnstable team was reorganized in 1955 under the old nickname "Townies", but this iteration only lasted two seasons. After another two seasons without a team in the league, Barnstable put forward a new team for the 1959 season, dubbed the Barnstable Red Sox.

Modern era (1963–present)
The Cape League was reorganized in 1963 and became officially sanctioned by the NCAA as a collegiate league. This marked the beginning of the league's "modern era". The Barnstable Red Sox had played in the Cape League from 1959 to 1962, but were not part of the newly-reorganized league in 1963. However, after the league's Bourne Canalmen dropped out of the league following the 1972 season, the number of teams in the league was reduced to an uneven seven, and an opportunity was perceived by then state senator and CCBL Hall of Famer John "Jack" Aylmer. A Barnstable native and member of the 1952 Barnstable Barons, Aylmer became the driving force of a movement to bring an expansion team to Hyannis. In 1976 the new team began play in the CCBL as the Hyannis Mets, so named in the hope that the team might enlist financial assistance from the New York Mets, which was not forthcoming.

1976: The Mets' inaugural season

In its inaugural season, the new Hyannis franchise played its home games at Barnstable High School, and was skippered by Ben Hays, who had previously managed in the league with Chatham. The Mets finished the regular season in fourth place in the eight-team league and posted a winning record, enough to qualify them for the playoffs where they were subsequently ousted by Chatham. The 1976 team included future major leaguers Ross Baumgarten and CCBL Hall of Famer Nat "Buck" Showalter, who launched the Mets' season by going 4 for 4 with a home run and 6 RBI in the team's opening day 17–5 victory over Falmouth. Showalter went on to bat a whopping .434 for the season and was named the 1976 CCBL MVP.

Back-to-back championships to close the 1970s

In only their third year in the league, the Mets finished the 1978 season with a 31–11 record, the best in the league. Managed by CCBL Hall of Famer Bob Schaefer, who had played and managed in the league with Sagamore and Bourne, the team was powered by three CCBL Hall of Fame players: pitcher Dennis Long, Holy Cross standout Ron Perry Jr., and slugging catcher Bill Schroeder, who belted 15 home runs for the Mets and was named the league's MVP and Outstanding Pro Prospect. The Mets faced Orleans in the semifinal playoffs, and took Game 1 at home. The Mets jumped out early in Game 2 at Eldredge Park on first-inning long balls by Schroeder and Jim Watkins. Watkins blasted another one in the eighth, and drove in six RBIs in the Mets' 10–7 series-clinching win. Hyannis moved on to meet Harwich in the best-of-five championship series. In Game 1 at home, the Mets found themselves down 6–1 early, but exploded behind two homers from Bob Teegarden, storming back for a 15–6 win. Teegarden launched another one in Game 2, and Pete Filson pitched a gem in the Mets' 6–1 win. The Mariners refused to roll over, however, taking Game 3 at Hyannis, 5–2. In Game 4, Jeff Twitty allowed two Mariner runs in the first, but settled down and didn't allow another run, going the distance in a 4–2 Hyannis victory that earned the Mets their first CCBL crown.

Schaefer's squad repeated the feat in 1979 with an even more impressive 33-win regular season, and a second championship victory over Harwich. 1979 was the team's first season of play in the newly-reconstructed McKeon Park. The team returned CCBL Hall of Famers Long and Perry, and featured yet another CCBL Hall of Famer in outfielder Ross Jones. Long posted an impressive 8–1 record for the Mets. League MVP Perry batted .401 for the regular season, but lost the batting title to Jones, who batted .413 and was named the league's Outstanding Pro Prospect. In the semi-final playoffs against Chatham, Hyannis sent Long to the mound for Game 1 at home, coming away with a 6–2 win. Game 2 at Veterans Field was closely contested until the Mets pushed across four runs in the ninth to take the series with an 8–4 victory. 

Facing Harwich in the title series for a second consecutive season, the Mets dropped a slugfest in Game 1, 12–10. Game 2 was a 12–2 Hyannis rout of the Mariners. Games 3 and 4 were played as a home-and-home doubleheader. The Mets took the afternoon front end at home, 12–6. In the nightcap at Whitehouse Field, Hyannis jumped out to a 5–0 lead in the top of the first, but when the Mariners scored two of their own in the bottom of the opening frame, the Mets brought in all-star reliever Ed Olwine for some long relief. Olwine had tossed two and two-thirds innings of relief in the Game 3 afternoon tilt, and proceeded to finish out Game 4, throwing an additional eight and one-third masterful innings in the Mets' 7–3 championship-clinching win.

Skipper Bob Schaefer left the Mets after the 1979 season, but his combined regular season record of 64–18–1 with two league championships in just two seasons with Hyannis is part of one of the most impressive managerial resumes in CCBL history.

The 1980s

The Mets made the playoffs five times in the 1980s, reaching the championship series twice, but coming up short both times. The 1980 Mets boasted league batting champ Brick Smith, who hit at a .391 clip. With a club that included future major league player and Boston Red Sox manager John Farrell, the 1982 Mets reached the title series but were swept by Chatham.

In 1987, Hyannis was led by a pair of CCBL Hall of Famers in pitcher Pat Hope and future major league all-star Robin Ventura. Hope set a league record with 11 victories, and hurled a perfect game against Wareham, while Ventura batted .370 and was the league's Outstanding Pro Prospect. The 1987 team also included slugger Albert "Joey" Belle, who went on to hit 381 major league home runs. The 1989 Mets were skippered by CCBL Hall of Famer Ed Lyons, and featured league Outstanding Pro Prospect and future Philadelphia Phillies all-star pitcher Tyler Green, but the club was again swept in the title series, this time by Y-D.

The 1990s and another title

Hyannis once again claimed the Cape League title in 1991, with a team that included future major leaguers Rich Aurilia and Boston Red Sox captain Jason Varitek. In the playoff semi-finals against Wareham, Varitek caught a no-hitter tossed by the Mets' Richard King. The Mets matched up against Chatham in the championship series. In Game 1 at McKeon Park, Southern Illinois University hurler Mike Van Gilder tossed 8 1/3 stellar innings for Hyannis, and University of Miami pinch-hitter Juan Llanes poked an RBI single with two outs in the ninth to give the Mets the walkoff win. Don Wengert was strong on the mound for the Mets in Game 2 at Chatham, and Hyannis got two-run blasts from Greg Shockey in the first and Matt Luke in the sixth to win 5–2 and complete the series sweep and claim a third CCBL crown. Chad McConnell took home playoff MVP honors. 

In 1993, Varitek returned to Hyannis from the 1991 title team and was named league MVP, winning the 1993 batting crown with a .371 average, and catching another no-hitter for Hyannis, this one thrown by future St. Louis Cardinals all-star Matt Morris. Varitek was inducted into the CCBL Hall of Fame in 2002.

After an all-star 1994 season for the Mets in which he tied the league record for doubles in a season (19), Indiana State University standout Dan Olson returned for another all-star campaign in Hyannis in 1995. He owned the night at the '95 mid-summer CCBL classic, claiming the All-Star Game Home Run Derby crown, then going 3-for-4 and taking home MVP honors in the West Division's 4–0 All-Star Game shutout victory.

The 2000s and the birth of the Harbor Hawks
Hyannis qualified for the postseason three times and reached the CCBL championship series once in the 2000s, being swept in 2000 by Brewster. The 2000 season saw internationally-acclaimed recording star and Martha's Vineyard resident Carly Simon on hand at McKeon Park to toss out the first pitch and take in a few innings of the Mets' July 11 game with Brewster. 

From 2002 through 2005, the Mets played an annual regular season home game at Tom Nevers Field in Nantucket, in what was billed as the "Nantucket Pennant" game. Falmouth won the 2002 Nantucket game, but the Mets avenged the loss by defeating the Commodores in the 2003 island rematch. Hyannis defeated Y-D, 9–7, in the 2004 event, but lost to Harwich, 9–3, in 2005. Also from 2002 to 2005, the Mets played an annual regular season home game at Fenton Field in Sandwich, Massachusetts, an event honoring the part Sandwich played in the early history of baseball on Cape Cod. Over the four-year span, the event saw the Mets play host to each of their four West Division CCBL rivals.

The Mets' 2003 team featured CCBL Hall of Famer Sam Fuld, a speedy center fielder and future major leaguer who batted .361 for the Mets. Charlie Furbush of South Portland, Maine twirled for Hyannis in 2005 and 2006. He was named the league's Outstanding New England Player in 2006, posting a 1.83 ERA in 54 innings, tossing a no-hitter against Bourne, and being named the West Division All-Star Game starter. Hyannis boasted the league's top batsman in 2006 in Matt Mangini, who led the league with a .310 average, and was West Division starting third baseman in the All-Star Game. University of Hawaii hurler Matt Daly provided the highlight of the 2007 season with a no-hitter against Wareham at McKeon Park. Mets Slugger Chris Dominguez crushed three home runs in a single game in 2008, the first CCBL player to accomplish the feat since Baseball Hall of Famer Frank Thomas did it for Orleans twenty years earlier.

In late 2008, Major League Baseball announced that it would enforce its trademarks, and required those CCBL teams who shared a nickname with an MLB team to either change their nicknames or buy their uniforms and merchandise only through MLB-licensed vendors. In 2009, two CCBL teams, Orleans and Chatham proceeded to change their nicknames. In 2010, Hyannis followed suit and became the Hyannis Harbor Hawks, the name an homage to the ospreys, or "fish hawks" who routinely nest atop the light stanchions at McKeon Park.

The 2010s and the Gassman era
The Harbor Hawks were skippered throughout the 2010s by Judson University coach Chad Gassman, who took the Hyannis post in 2009 after serving as pitching coach the prior season. Under Gassman, Hyannis qualified for postseason play six times in the 2010s, but reached the championship series only once. 

The 2012 Harbor Hawks team featured the league's Outstanding Pitcher and Outstanding Pro Prospect, Sean Manaea. Manaea went on to play in the major leagues for the Oakland A's, throwing a no-hitter against the Boston Red Sox in 2018. The Harbor Hawks boasted the league's Outstanding Pro Prospect for a second consecutive year as Jeff Hoffman won the 2013 award. Harbor Hawk switch-pitching phenom Ryan Perez made national headlines hurling from both sides in the 2014 CCBL All-Star Game, and earning the game's West Division MVP Award.

In 2015, Gassman's club finished in first place atop the West Division and was led by a trio of top moundsmen. Aaron Civale posted an 0.36 ERA with five saves in 25 innings, Dakota Hudson hurled 42.2 innings with a 1.68 ERA and 41 strikeouts, and Devin Smeltzer, the West Division All-Star Game co-MVP, threw a nine-inning no-hitter against Harwich in which he missed a perfect game by a single walk. In the playoffs, the Hawks defeated Cotuit in the first-round series, then shut down Bourne in the West finals to reach the league championship series, where the Harbor Hawks were defeated two games to one by Y-D. 

In 2016, the Harbor Hawks named the baseball field at McKeon Park in honor of longtime CCBL president Judy Walden Scarafile. Harbor Hawks took home top honors at the 2016 CCBL All-Star Game, as slugger Kameron Esthay claimed the pre-game home run derby crown, and shortstop Zach Rutherford went 3-for-3 with a homer and two RBIs on his way to being named West Division game MVP. The 2018 Harbor Hawks featured league MVP and batting champion Matthew Barefoot, who finished the season with a .379 mark. After the 2019 season, Gassman, the longest-tenured manager in team history, announced he would not be returning after 11 seasons with Hyannis.

The 2020s
The 2020 CCBL season was cancelled due to the coronavirus pandemic. 2021 saw Michigan's Clark Elliott claim the league batting crown for Hyannis with a .344 average. CCBL Hall of Famer Eric Beattie, who pitched in the league for Bourne in 2003, took the helm as Harbor Hawks skipper in 2022, and promptly earned the league's Manager of the Year award in his first season. Led by the league's 10th Player award winner Rikuu Nishida and Outstanding New England Player Jordy Allard, Beattie's 2022 Hawks notched a first-round playoff series victory and an appearance in the West Division finals for the first time since 2015.

CCBL Hall of Fame inductees

The CCBL Hall of Fame and Museum is a history museum and hall of fame honoring past players, coaches, and others who have made outstanding contributions to the CCBL. Below are the inductees who spent all or part of their time in the Cape League with Hyannis.

Notable alumni

Austin Adams 2008
Jeff Alkire 1991
Brian Anderson 2013
Rich Aurilia 1991
John Axford 2002
Jack Aylmer 1952
Charlie Barnes 2016
Kimera Bartee 1992
Adam Bass 2002
Ross Baumgarten 1976
Mike Baxter 2004–2005
Albert Belle 1987
Kris Benson 1994
Casey Blake 1996
Jaime Bluma 1992
Jackie Bradley Jr. 2009
Rod Brewer 1986
Greg Briley 1985
Brian Buchanan 1994
Jeromy Burnitz 1988
Pat Burrell 1996
Thomas Burrows 2015
Matt Buschmann 2004
Mike Bynum 1997–1998
Eric Byrnes 1996–1997
Matt Carson 2000
Curt Casali 2008
Randy Choate 1996
Aaron Civale 2015
Josh Collmenter 2006
Tony Comerford 1925–1926
Dick Conway 1888
Charles B. Cory 1888–1892
Mike Costanzo 2004
Charles Richard Crane 1888–1892
Pat Creeden 1924–1931
James Darnell 2006–2007
Bob Davidson 1983
Jarret DeHart 2014
Ben DeLuzio 2014–2015
Sean DePaula 1995
Matt Dermody 2010–2011
Donnie Dewees 2014
Brent Dlugach 2003
Chris Dominguez 2008
Brendan Donovan 2017
Harry Downes 1933
Kirk Dressendorfer 1988
Jake Dunning 2009
Dave Elder 1996
Dietrich Enns 2011
Jorge Fábregas 1990
Peter Fairbanks 2013–2014
Monty Fariss 1987
John Farrell 1982
Pete Filson 1977–1978
Joseph Fitzgerald 1926
Ryan Flaherty 2006
Dylan Floro 2011
Josh Fogg 1996
Kyle Freeland 2013
Sam Fuld 2003
Charlie Furbush 2005–2006
Ed Gallagher 1931, 1933
Ryan Garko 2001–2002
Mitch Garver 2012
Brent Gates 1991
Ian Gibaut 2014
Lucas Gilbreath 2016
Ed Gill 1917
Barney Gilligan 1889
Mike Glavine 1994
Ross Gload 1995–1996
Don Gordon 1981
Artie Gore 1934
Tyler Green 1989
Kip Gross 1985
Mert Hackett 1888–1891
Sam Haggerty 2014
Frank Hallowell 1893
Brendan Harris 2000–2001
Joe Harvey 2013
Curt Hasler 1985
Austin Hays 2015
Scott Hemond 1984
Eric Hinske 1997
Jim Hoey 2001
Jeff Hoffman 2012–2013
Shanty Hogan 1924
Gavin Hollowell 2018
Steve Holm 2000
Brian Horwitz 2002
Dakota Hudson 2015
Ryan Jackson 2007
Zach Jackson 2003
Chris Jelic 1984
Eddie Jeremiah 1930
Chris Johnson 2005
Ross Jones 1979
Scott Jordan 1984
Mike King 2015
Fred Klobedanz 1909
Jason Lane 1998
Myles Lane 1929–1931
Brett Laxton 1996
Jeff Ledbetter 1980
Carlton Loewer 1994
Nick Loftin 2019
Andrew Lorraine 1991–1992
Donny Lucy 2002–2003
Matt Luke 1991
Danny MacFayden 1924
Waddy MacPhee 1930
Scotti Madison 1979
Sean Manaea 2012
Matt Mangini 2006
Jake Mangum 2018
Joe Martinez 2004
Jamie McAndrew 1987
Chad McConnell 1991
Dinny McNamara 1929
Art Merewether 1925
Lennie Merullo 1935
Mike Metcalfe 1993
Matt Miller 1996
Doug Mirabelli 1990
Freddie Moncewicz 1923–1927, 1929, 1932–1933
Matt Morris 1993
Kevin Morton 1988
Jon Moscot 2011
Jake Noll 2015
Ted Olson 1934–1935
Ed Olwine 1978–1979
Vinnie Pasquantino 2018
Ben Paulsen 2008
Ryan Pepiot 2018
Jason Perry 2001
Ron Perry 1978–1979
D. J. Peterson 2012
Shane Peterson 2007
Tony Plansky 1928–1929
Kevin Plawecki 2011
Kevin Polcovich 1990
Ford Proctor 2017
Scott Proctor 1997–1998
Danny Putnam 2002
J. J. Putz 1998
Mike Rabelo 2000
Wes Rachels 1996
Jon Ratliff 1992
Colin Rea 2010
Joey Rickard 2011
Chris Robinson 2004
Shane Robinson 2004
Jake Rogers 2015
Dan Rohrmeier 1986
Seth Rosin 2009
Emil "Bud" Roy 1933
Blondy Ryan 1929
Nick Sandlin 2017
Jack Santora 1998
Mac Sceroler 2016
Bill Schroeder 1978
Joel "Joe" Sherman 1906–1913, 1927–1931
Buck Showalter 1976
Danny Silva 1928–1932
Justin Simmons 2003
Austin Slater 2013–2014
Devin Smeltzer 2015
Brick Smith 1979–1980
Mike Smith 1999
Cy Sneed  2013
Elliot Soto 2009
John Spirida 1935–1937, 1939
Eric Stamets 2011
Ken Strong 
Vito Tamulis 1929
Graham Taylor 2003–2004
Matt Thaiss 2015
Ryan Thompson 2013
Ashur Tolliver 2008
Cal Towey 2011
Jeff Twitty 1978
John Valentin 1988
Jason Varitek 1991, 1993
Robin Ventura 1987
Drew VerHagen 2010
Zach Vincej 2011
Joe Vitiello 1989–1990
John Wasdin 1992
Ryan Weiss 2017
Davis Wendzel 2018
Don Wengert 1991
Jordan Westburg 2019
Sanford White 1909
Steve Wilkerson 2012–2013
Jackson Williams 2006
Brian Wilson 2002
Tyler Wilson 2009–2010
Ed Wineapple 1928–1930
Samuel Winslow 1884
Nick Wittgren 2011 
Tracy Woodson 1983

Yearly results

Results by season, 1923–1939

* During the CCBL's 1923–1939 era, postseason playoffs were a rarity. In most years, the regular season pennant winner was simply crowned as the league champion.However, there were four years in which the league split its regular season and crowned separate champions for the first (A) and second (B) halves. In two of thoseseasons (1936 and 1939), a single team won both halves and was declared overall champion. In the other two split seasons (1933 and 1935), a postseasonplayoff series was contested between the two half-season champions to determine the overall champion.

Results by season, 1946–1962

* Regular seasons split into first and second halves are designated as (A) and (B).

Results by season, 1976–present

League award winners

(*) - Indicates co-recipient

All-Star Game selections

Italics - Indicates All-Star Game Home Run Hitting Contest participant (1988 to present)

No-hit games

Managerial history

See also
 Hyannis Harbor Hawks players

References

External links

Rosters

 2000
 2001
 2002
 2003
 2004
 2005
 2006
 2007
 2008
 2009
 2010
 2011
 2012
 2013
 2014
 2015
 2016
 2017
 2018
 2019
 2021
 2022

Other links
Hyannis Harbor Hawks official site
CCBL Home Page

Cape Cod Baseball League teams
Amateur baseball teams in Massachusetts
Barnstable, Massachusetts